Reina de corazones (English: Queen of Hearts) is an American telenovela produced by Joshua Mintz and Aurelio Valcárcel Carroll for Telemundo.

The series stars Paola Núñez as Reina, Eugenio Siller as Nicolás, Laura Flores as Sara, Juan Soler as Víctor and Catherine Siachoque as Estefanía.

Overview
A story of a love that must overcome the barrier of memory, where glamorous nightlife and casinos play a prominent role in a plot characterized by mysterious twists and turns, espionage, conspiracy, intrigue, crime, and romance.

Plot
Reina Ortíz (Paola Núñez) will suffer an accident that will cause her to forget the last eight years of her life, in which she became the wife of tycoon Víctor de Rosas (Juan Soler), Clara's (Nicole Apollonio) mother and the owner of the most famous bridal atelier in Las Vegas. She doesn't even remember the happiest moment of her life; when she fell in love with Nicolás Núñez (Eugenio Siller). Now Reina, who feels she doesn't belong to the world of luxury and power, will strive to discover her own truth.

Meanwhile, Nicolás, who is working for the secret service under a new identity as Javier Bolivar, is seeking revenge after Estefanía Pérez (Catherine Siachoque) made him believe Reina and Víctor were responsible for his unjust imprisonment.

Entangled in secrets, tricks and deceptions in a double life of gamble under the framework of gold and precious stones trafficking, Nicolás and Reina will fight for the only thing they cannot leave to chance, their love.

Cast

Main 

Paola Núñez as Reina Ortíz
Eugenio Siller as Nicolás Núñez / Javier Bolivar de Rosas
Juan Soler as Víctor de Rosas
Catherine Siachoque as Estefanía Pérez de Hidalgo
Laura Flores as Sara Smith / Virginia de la Vega

Recurring 

Gabriel Coronel as Frank Marino
Henry Zakka as Octavio de Rosas / Gerónimo de Rosas
Paulo Quevedo as Isidro Castillo
Sergio Mur as Fernando San Juan / Patricio Picasso "El Supremo" / Gregorio Pérez
Geraldine Galván as Greta de Rosas
Pablo Azar as Juan José "Juanjo" García
Wanda D'Isidoro as Susana Santillán
María Luisa Flores as Constanza "Connie" Leiva
Thali García as Camila de Rosas
Rosalinda Rodríguez as Carmen Solís
Paloma Márquez as Miriam Fuentes
Raúl Arrieta as Andrés Hidalgo
Sebastián Ferrat as Christian Palacios
Ezequiel Montalt as Juan Balboa "Rocky"
Priscila Perales as Delfina Ortíz
Marisa Del Portillo as Asunción Gomez / Maruja Torres
Guido Massri as Damian Hernández
Nicole Apollonio as Clara de Rosas
Emmanuel Pérez as Román Leiva

Guest stars 
Juan Pablo Gamboa as Mauro Montalbán
Carlos Ferro as Lázaro Leiva
Maritza Bustamante as Jacqueline "Jackie" Montoya
Jessica Mas as Alicia Palacios "La Cobra"
Juan Manuel Restrepo as José Paiscano

Broadcast 

The series originally aired from April 28 to November 7, 2014 in Mexico on Gala TV. The series aired on Telemundo from July 7 until December 1, 2014.

Awards and nominations

References

2014 telenovelas
2014 American television series debuts
2014 American television series endings
American telenovelas
American television series based on telenovelas
Telemundo telenovelas